PSi Technologies provides power semiconductor assembly and test services to the power semiconductor market. It offers assembly services for power conversion and power management semiconductors; and design services to address power packaging needs of customers. The company also provides test services, including parametric, avalanche, reverse recovery time, integrated serial, and package isolation testing; and embossed carrier taping. In addition, it offers power packages and services designed for power semiconductors used in telecommunications and networking systems, computers and computer peripherals, consumer electronics, electronic office equipment, automotive systems, and industrial products. The company was founded in 1988 and is based in Laguna, the Philippines. PSi Technologies operates as a subsidiary of Integrated Micro-Electronics, Inc. PSi owns 40% of PSiTech Realty, the holding company of Pacsem Realty, which is a real estate company that acquires, holds, develops and disposes any real estate or interest acquired.

In 2010, Integrated Micro-Electronics, Inc. bought shares of PSi as part of a strategy to offer an integrated hybrid power solution in a multi-chip module that contains advanced manufacturing technologies. It allowed IMI to own majority or 56 percent of the power semiconductor company.

In 2012, Integrated Micro-Electronics bought out minority shareholders to increase their ownership of PSi Technologies to 100 percent.

References 

Assembly and Test semiconductor companies
Companies based in Laguna (province)
Ayala Corporation subsidiaries
Semiconductor companies of the Philippines